The 1951 Oklahoma Sooners baseball team represented the University of Oklahoma in the 1951 NCAA baseball season. The team was coached by Jack Baer in his 7th season at Oklahoma.

The Sooners won the College World Series, defeating the Tennessee Volunteers in the championship game.

Roster

Schedule

Awards and honors 
Jack Shirley
 All-America Second Team

References 

Oklahoma
Oklahoma Sooners baseball seasons
College World Series seasons
NCAA Division I Baseball Championship seasons
Big Eight Conference baseball champion seasons